Oleksandr Oleksandrovych Masalov (born 22 January 1997) is a Ukrainian professional footballer who plays as a centre-back.

Club career
Masalov is a youth product of Dynamo Kyiv. In 2016 he moved to the Shakhtar Donetsk academy.

Kolos Kovalivka
Masalov started his senior career with Kolos Kovalivka.

Dinamo-Auto Tiraspol
In 2019 he moved to Dinamo-Auto Tiraspol, where he played 34 matches. He reached the quarter-final of the 2019–20 Moldovan Cup in his first season with the club. On 27 August 2020, he played in the first qualifying of the 2020-21 UEFA Europa League against Ventspils. In the 2020–21 Moldovan Cup, he helped the side reach the semi-final.

Desna Chernihiv
In August 2021 he moved to Desna Chernihiv the Ukrainian Premier League on a one-year contract. On 14 August he made his league debut for the club against SC Dnipro-1 at the Stadion Yuri Gagarin, replacing Vikentiy Voloshyn at the 74th minute.

Ufa
In August 2022, he signed for Ufa in the Russian First League. His contract with Ufa was terminated by mutual consent on 7 February 2023.

Personal life
In August 2022, after the confirmation of his move to Russian side Ufa, members of supporters' club "Ultras Desna" recorded a video in which they burned what they alleged to be Masalov's Russian passport. In the video, in which they accused the footballer of "treason," the ultras claimed to have delivered his Ukrainian passport to the national security services, to "let the intelligence services deal with shit like you".

Career statistics

Club

Honours
Shakhtar Donetsk
Ukrainian Premier League Reserves runners-up 2016–17

References

External links
Profile on Official website of FC Desna Chernihiv
Statistics at UAF website (Ukr)

1997 births
Living people
Sportspeople from Sevastopol
Association football defenders
Ukrainian footballers
Ukraine youth international footballers
FC Kolos Kovalivka players
FC Dinamo-Auto Tiraspol players
FC Desna Chernihiv players
FC Ufa players
Ukrainian First League players
Moldovan Super Liga players
Ukrainian Premier League players
Russian First League players
Ukrainian expatriate footballers
Expatriate footballers in Moldova
Ukrainian expatriate sportspeople in Moldova
Expatriate footballers in Russia
Ukrainian expatriate sportspeople in Russia